Magong Chenghuang Temple is a temple in Magong, Penghu, Taiwan. This temple mainly serves Chenghuangye, means the lord of City. (Chinese: 城隍爺; pinyin: Chéng-huáng-yé), a taoist God, who is in charge of the underworld of an administrative district ( a little similar to Hades), so it was translated to the City God usually.

History 
By tradition way, there is only one Chenghuang Temple in each county or city, and is next to the city hall always. But there are two Chenghuang temples in Penghu County you can see in the present. The original city hall of Penghu (澎湖廳署) was located at Wenao (文澳) district, so the Chenghuang Temple was built in there as well.

But Wenao Chenghuang Temple was too narrow to express the residents' respect enough. Hence, In 1777, XIE Wei-Qi (Chinese: 謝維祺; pinyin: Xiè wéi qí ),an officer of Penghu (澎湖海防糧補通判) during Qing Dynasty, who suggested establish another one in Magong harbour area. The new one was completed in 1779.

This temple was ever damaged during the Sino-French War in 1885. That moment, many people said they saw Chenghuangye appearing for protecting them from war and insecurity. After the war was over and French navy retreated in the autumn of 1885, Chenghuang Temple finished repairing in the next year, according to folk story of miracle, Guangxu Emperor promoted Magong Chenghuangye's religious rank.

Afterwards, Magong Chenghuangye named Lin Ying Hou (Chinese: 靈應侯; pinyin: líng yīng hóu ) as well. The meaning of Lin Ying Hou, its first character Lin (靈) means "spirit"; and the second character Ying (應) means "feel" or "answer"; the third character Hou (侯), means " one of ranks of Chinese nobilIty". So, Lin Ying Hou (靈應侯) means that this lord of god who will show its spirit to answer you, or you can feel the spirit appear.

Architecture 
In addition, Magong Chenghuang Temple also collected a plenty of beautiful wooden carvings, colorful paintings, historic sign boards or steles, very worthy to take time to discover.

See also 
 Penghu Mazu Temple
 Penghu Guanyin Temple
 Magong Beiji Temple
 Penghu Shuixian Temple
 List of temples in Taiwan

References 

1779 establishments in Taiwan
Religious buildings and structures completed in 1779
Taoist temples in Taiwan
Temples in Penghu County